Dead Space is a media franchise created by Glen Schofield. The franchise is focused around a series of survival horror video games, the franchise was produced by Visceral Games (formerly EA Redwood Shores), and published by Electronic Arts from 2008 to 2013. The series began with the titular first title, and was followed by two direct sequels; Dead Space 2 in 2011, and Dead Space 3 in 2013. Following the cancellation of a planned fourth entry, the series remained dormant until the announcement of a remake of the first game.

The series covers three mainline entries released for PlayStation 3, Xbox 360 and Microsoft Windows; and multiple spin-off titles on other platforms co-developed with external studios set before or between the main games. To complement and expand upon the games' narratives, the team and Electronic Arts created a multimedia franchise covering animated movies and printed media, collaborating with several studios and creators. Each of the main games also received soundtrack albums of its music, composed primarily by Jason Graves.

Video games
The original Dead Space began production in 2006 at Visceral Games (then EA Redwood Shores); the aim of creator Glen Schofield was to design the most frightening survival horror experience possible at the time, drawing inspiration from the  Resident Evil 4, and a range of movies including Event Horizon and Alien. Following the first game, the series was expanded into a trilogy. The next two entries were Dead Space 2 in 2011, and Dead Space 3 in 2013. The second and third games received single-playing downloadable content (DLC) episodes which expanded upon the narrative. A fourth entry was planned, which would have expanded upon space sections of Dead Space 3 and potentially featured a new protagonist, but it was cancelled and Visceral Games was eventually closed down in 2017. The series remained dormant until the announcement of a remake of the first game in 2021. In addition, to expand upon different narrative elements and diversify on its gameplay, spin-off titles were created in collaboration with other developers.

Main entries

Spin-offs

Remakes

Other media
Alongside the original video game, the developers and publisher decided to expand the narrative into a comic series of the same name and an animated film which acted as prequels to the game's plot; this approach was described by Electronic Arts as "IP cubed". After the original game's success, Electronic Arts continued to expand upon the series lore using these additional media, now referring to the series as a "trans-media franchise". The writer for much of this material up to 2012 was Anthony Johnston, who had also helped with writing on the original game. The graphic novel Dead Space: Liberation was instead written by Ian Edginton. Illustrations for these projects was handled first by Ben Templesmith, known for his work on 30 Days of Night; and later by Christopher Shy of Studio Ronin. Genre writer B. K. Evenson also penned two prequel novels set centuries before the first game; Dead Space: Martyr in 2010 and Dead Space: Catalyst in 2012. Reports of a feature film adaptation were active between 2009 and 2013, with several people announced as being attached but nothing further being announced.

The series' music was primarily composed by Jason Graves, who drew inspiration from the work of Christopher Young and focusing on blending the music with the game ambience. He evolved his style over the course of the series by incorporating specific character themes, and collaborated on Dead Space 3 with James Hannigan. The movies were scored respectively by Seth Podowitz and Christopher Tin. Each of the three mainline games seeing a soundtrack album release.

Films

Printed

Soundtracks

References

Dead Space
Dead Space
Horror fiction lists